Vahramaberd is a village in the Akhuryan Municipality of the Shirak Province of Armenia.

Demographics

References 

Populated places in Shirak Province